The Lunda languages are a clade of Bantu languages coded Zone L.50 in Guthrie's classification. According to Nurse & Philippson (2003), the languages form a valid node. They are:
 Lunda, Salampasu, Ruund

Footnotes

References